The 2017–18 SV Sandhausen season is the 102nd season in the football club's history. The season covers a period from 1 July 2017 to 30 June 2018.

Players

Squad information

Friendly matches

Competitions

2. Bundesliga

League table

Results summary

Results by round

Matches

DFB-Pokal

References

SV Sandhausen seasons
Sandhausen